This article contains the discography of the Greek singer Nikos Oikonomopoulos.

It consists of ten studio albums including Gia Hilious Logous, Ennoeitai and Tha Eimai Edo which became quadruple platinum, and thirty-five singles including "Gia Kapoio Logo" which is one of the most viewed Greek songs on YouTube.

Discography

Studio albums

Compilation albums

Singles
"—" denotes a single that has not charted or was not released in that region.

References

Discographies of Greek artists